The Pennsylvania State Athletic Conference (PSAC) men's basketball tournament is the annual conference basketball championship tournament for the Pennsylvania State Athletic Conference. It is a single-elimination tournament and seeding is based on regular season records.

Between 1951 and 1960, the regular season champion was declared league champion based on record alone. From 1961 to 1980, a singular championship game was held between the top two teams from the regular season standings. Finally, a tournament (of varying sizes, presently at 12) has been held each year since 1981.

The winner, declared conference champion, receives the PSAC's automatic bid to the NCAA Men's Division II Basketball Championship.

Results

Pre-tournament champions

1951 – Lock Haven State
1952 – Lock Haven State
1953 – Bloomsburg State
1954 – Millersville State

1955 – Millersville State
1956 – Millersville State
1957 – Millersville State

1958 – Millersville State
1959 – West Chester State
1960 – Indiana State (PA)

Championship game only

Tournament championship game

Championship records

 Schools highlighted in pink are former PSAC members.
 Shepherd is the only current PSAC member that has yet to reach the tournament final. However, Shepherd is the newest PSAC member, having joined in 2019.

See also
 PSAC women's basketball tournament

References

NCAA Division II men's basketball conference tournaments
Tournament
Recurring sporting events established in 1981